A mass shooting occurred near and in Nakhon Ratchasima, Thailand, colloquially known as Korat, between 8 and 9 February 2020. A soldier of the Royal Thai Army killed 29 people and wounded 58 others before he was eventually shot and killed.

The attack began when the perpetrator shot and killed his commanding officer and two others at Suratham Phithak Military Camp, the base where he was stationed. The perpetrator then stole military weapons and a Humvee and drove to the Terminal 21 Korat shopping mall, which had a large number of shoppers due to the public holiday Magha Puja, where he opened fire on shoppers. On the way, he also fired at several people on the road and at Wat Pa Sattha Ruam, a Buddhist temple. During the attack, the perpetrator posted updates and shared a live stream on his Facebook account. At the time, it was the deadliest mass shooting in Thailand's history.

Shootings

House and Suratham Phithak Military Camp 
The shooting began at about 15:30 local time on 8 February 2020 at a house, where the gunman arrived to discuss a property dispute with his commander, Colonel Anantharot Krasae. The gunman confronted him, stole his weapon and shot him dead. He then shot and killed the commander's mother-in-law.

Afterwards, the gunman went to the Suratham Phithak army base where he worked and raided the camp, stealing from a guard post and the camp armories two Type 11 assault rifles (a variant of the HK33), an M60 machine gun as well as 776 rounds of ammunition, killing a soldier in the process. He then stole a Humvee and wounded the driver. The gunman escaped the base and opened fire on two police officers and two civilians, wounding them. The officers sustained multiple gunshot wounds in their legs and backs.

Buddhist temple and Terminal 21 Korat shopping mall 
After escaping, the gunman started shooting in the street: he stopped outside Wat Pa Sattha Ruam, a Buddhist temple, and killed eight civilians and a police officer. He then arrived at the Terminal 21 Korat shopping mall in the city of Nakhon Ratchasima. At that point he left the vehicle and began shooting indiscriminately at people outside the mall, killing 12 civilians, before detonating a gas cylinder. He then entered the mall, killing two people and taking sixteen hostages inside the mall on the fourth floor. The gunman live streamed on Facebook Live during the siege and shared photos and memes on his profile page, although his account was eventually taken down by Facebook.

Police officers and soldiers stormed the mall and demanded the gunman's surrender, to which he responded by opening fire, killing two policemen and a soldier and wounding at least three others. He remained inside for several hours, during which his mother was brought by authorities to try to convince him to surrender.

On 9 February, at 09:13 local time, police announced that they had shot and killed the gunman.

Perpetrator 
Sergeant Major 1st Class Jakrapanth Thomma (4April 19889February 2020), age 31, was identified as the gunman. His hometown was Kaeng Khro, located in Chaiyaphum Province. He was stationed at the Suratham Phithak Military Base, where the first shooting took place. Thomma previously received training as a non-commissioned officer and was an expert marksman. 

Thomma's acquaintances said he was upset over being allegedly cheated out of a property deal and not being given back his money by his commanding officer, Colonel Anantharot Krasae, and Krasae's mother-in-law, who were both shot dead. During the livestream of the shooting, Thomma shouted, "Rich from cheating and taking advantage of people... Do they think they can take money to spend in hell?"

Aftermath

Social media use 
The perpetrator posted on social media during his attack, asking on Facebook if he should surrender. He had previously posted a picture of a pistol and bullets, captioned "It is time to get excited," and "Nobody can avoid death." Facebook responded by removing the page and issuing a statement condemning the attack.

Criticism of media coverage 
The events of the shooting were initially covered as live broadcasts near the scene by Thai broadcasters, which received public and governmental criticism for possibly providing the gunman with information about the movements of authorities intervening at the scene. Thailand's broadcast regulator, the NBTC, have called a meeting with representatives of television stations for discussion of their live broadcasts of the siege. NBTC secretary-general Takorn Tanthasit stated he ordered all TV stations to stop live broadcasting the situation and any other information that could have impeded the actions of authorities from intervening, and had issued warnings that were ignored by some stations, which he implied will lead to disciplinary action. The hashtags #แบนช่องone ("Ban Channel One"), #แบนไทยรัฐ ("Ban Thai Rath") and #สื่อไร้จรรยาบรรณ ("Media without ethics") trended on Twitter in Thailand in response to the media's live coverage.

Criticism of military and government 
In the aftermath, the military co-run government was a target of anger, with the hashtags "Reform the Military" and "Prayuth RIP" trending on Twitter. In particular, it was criticized for being unable to prevent one of its own soldiers from easily stealing weapons and committing the shootings, contrasting with its strong control of politics and the economy. In January 2020, General Apirat Kongsompong lauded new laws intended to make it more difficult for ill-intentioned people to steal weapons from the military.

See also 

 Crime in Thailand
 List of massacres in Thailand
 Live streaming crime
 2022 Nong Bua Lamphu massacre

References 

2020 in military history
2020 murders in Thailand
2020 mass shootings in Asia
Massacres in Thailand
21st-century mass murder in Asia
Attacks on buildings and structures in 2020
Attacks on buildings and structures in Thailand
Attacks on military installations in the 2020s
Attacks on religious buildings and structures in Asia
February 2020 crimes in Asia
Filmed killings
Hostage rescue operations
Hostage taking in Thailand
Livestreamed crimes
Mass murder in 2020
Mass murder in Thailand
Mass shootings in Thailand
Military history of Thailand
Shooting
Royal Thai Army
Attacks on shopping malls
Spree shootings in Thailand